Dale E. Hoggins (born 1932) is an American former politician in the state of Washington. He served the 21st district from 1967 to 1975, and is a member of the Republican party.

Hoggins attended Western Washington University and the University of Washington, earning Bachelor of Arts and Masters of Education degrees. He was an elementary school principal in Mountlake Terrace, Washington when he was first elected to the Washington State Legislature in 1967. During his time in the state house, he served as Chairman of the Education and Libraries committee. Hoggins resides in Edmonds, Washington. He is married to Donna and has three children.

References

Living people
1932 births
People from Yakima County, Washington
Republican Party members of the Washington House of Representatives